Robert R. Panasik (born October 20, 1941) is a Canadian professional golfer.

Born in Windsor, Ontario, he was known as Bob Panasiuk until 1970 when he changed his name to Panasik so it would be "easier to pronounce".

In 1957, at the age of 15, Panasik made the halfway cut in the Canadian Open to become the youngest player ever to play all four rounds in a PGA Tour event, a record which stood until April 2013 when his record was broken by Guan Tianlang. He went on to win the Canadian PGA Championship twice as well as many provincial tournaments in Canada. He also qualified for the U.S. Open on several occasions and represented Canada in three World Cups.

Panasik continued his success as a senior, playing one full season on the Senior PGA Tour (later known as the Champions Tour) in 1994. Back in Canada, he has won the Canadian PGA Seniors Championship three times and the Super Seniors Championship twice.

Panasik was inducted into the Canadian Golf Hall of Fame in 2005.

Amateur wins
1958 Canadian Junior Championship
1959 Ontario Amateur Championship

Professional wins

Regular wins
1962 Ontario PGA Assistants Championship
1963 Ontario PGA Assistants Championship
1968 Michigan PGA Assistants Championship
1970 Michigan PGA Assistants Championship
1972 Canadian PGA Championship, Waterloo Open Golf Classic
1973 Canadian PGA Championship, Newfoundland Open
1974 Quebec Open, Saskatchewan Open, Alberta Open
1975 Alberta Open
1979 Ontario PGA Championship, Ontario Spring Open
1981 Canadian PGA Club Professionals Championship
1984 Ontario PGA Championship
1986 Manitoba Open, Victoria Open
1987 Ontario Spring Open
1993 Canadian PGA Club Professionals Championship
2002 Ontario Spring Open

Senior wins
1997 Canadian PGA Seniors Championship
1998 Canadian PGA Seniors Championship, Ontario PGA Seniors Championship
2001 Canadian PGA Seniors Championship
2003 Canadian PGA Super Seniors Championship
2004 Canadian PGA Super Seniors Championship

Team appearances
World Cup (representing Canada): 1972, 1973, 1975

See also 

 1968 APG Tour Qualifying School graduates

References

External links

Bob Panasik's profile at the Canadian Golf Hall of Fame

Canadian male golfers
PGA Tour Champions golfers
Golfing people from Ontario
Sportspeople from Windsor, Ontario
1941 births
Living people